Thetha Gohain Than (Assamese: থেঠা গোসাঁইৰ থান) in Dokoha, Nalbari district, Assam is a 19th-century Hindu temple and is dedicated to Krishna. The temple was established at the end of the 19th century, on a piece of land donated by the late Janmi Majumdar who was an inhabitant of Kamarkuchi of Nalbari district. Thetha Gohain (Assamese: থেঠা গোসাঁই) means child  Krishna.  
Land development and plantation plan have been registered under NREGA for further development of this temple.

References

 Hindu temples in Assam
Krishna temples